Night Sky Games is an American game company that produces role-playing games and game supplements.

History
Night Sky Games was the creation of Meguey Baker.  The first design from Meguey Baker and Night Sky Games was A Thousand and One Nights: A Game of Enticing Stories (2006). After the initial publication of Thousand and One Nights, Night Sky Games did not produce any more games for several years. In 2011, Meguey started revising her web page, and shortly afterward the company resumed producing games. Her husband Vincent Baker released his own Apocalypse World game Trauma Games Presents: Murderous Ghosts (2011) through Night Sky Games. Psi*Run (2012) was Meguey’s second game, and the third publication from Night Sky. After releasing that revised edition of A Thousand and One Nights, Night Sky Games began distributing Bacchanalia (2012) by Paul Czege and Michele Gelli. Night Sky Games then returned to the publications of Meguey herself with Valiant Girls (2013), a nanogame and Night Sky's sixth release.

References

Role-playing game publishing companies